Delta II was an expendable launch system, originally designed and built by McDonnell Douglas. Delta II was part of the Delta rocket family and entered service in 1989. Delta II vehicles included the Delta 6000, and the two later Delta 7000 variants ("Light" and "Heavy"). The rocket flew its final mission ICESat-2 on 15 September 2018, earning the launch vehicle a streak of 100 successful missions in a row, with the last failure being GPS IIR-1 in 1997.

History 
In the early 1980s, all United States expendable launch vehicles were planned to be phased out in favor of the Space Shuttle, which would be responsible for all government and commercial launches. Production of Delta, Atlas-Centaur, and Titan 34D had ended. The Challenger disaster of 1986 and the subsequent halt of Shuttle operations changed this policy, and President Ronald Reagan announced in December 1986 that the Space Shuttle would no longer launch commercial payloads, and NASA would seek to purchase launches on expendable vehicles for missions that did not require crew or Shuttle support.

McDonnell Douglas, at that time the manufacturer of the Delta family, signed a contract with the U.S. Air Force in 1987 to provide seven Delta II. These were intended to launch a series of Global Positioning System (GPS) Block II satellites, which had previously been manifested for the Space Shuttle. The Air Force exercised additional contract options in 1988, expanding this order to 20 vehicles, and NASA purchased its first Delta II in 1990 for the launch of three Earth-observing satellites.

The first Delta II 7000-series flew on November 26, 1990, replacing the RS-27 engine of the 6000-series with the more powerful RS-27A engine. Additionally, the steel-cased Castor 4A solid boosters of the 6000 series were replaced with the composite-cased GEM-40. All further Delta II launches except three were of this upgraded configuration, and the 6000-series was retired in 1992 with the last launch being on July 24.

McDonnell Douglas began Delta III development in the mid-1990s as increasing satellite mass required more powerful launch vehicles. Delta III, with its liquid hydrogen second stage and more powerful GEM-46 boosters, could bring twice as much mass as Delta II to geostationary transfer orbit, but a string of two failures and one partial failure, along with the development of the much more powerful Delta IV, led to the cancellation of the Delta III program. The upgraded boosters would still find use on the Delta II, leading to the Delta II Heavy.

On 28 March 2003, the Air Force Space Command began the process of deactivating the Delta II launch facilities and infrastructure at Cape Canaveral once the last of the second-generation GPS satellites were launched. However, in 2008, it instead announced that it would transfer all the Delta II facilities and infrastructure to NASA to support the launch of the Gravity Recovery and Interior Laboratory (GRAIL) in 2011.

On 14 December 2006, with the launch of USA-193, was the first launch of the Delta II operated by United Launch Alliance.

The last GPS launch aboard a Delta II, and the final launch from SLC-17A at Cape Canaveral was in 2009. The GRAIL Launch in 2011 marked the last Delta II Heavy launch and the last from Florida. The final five launches would all be from Vandenberg Air Force Base in California.

On 16 July 2012, NASA selected the Delta II to support the Orbiting Carbon Observatory (OCO-2), Soil Moisture Active Passive (SMAP), and Joint Polar Satellite System (JPSS-1 - NOAA-20) missions. This marked the final purchase of Delta II. OCO-2 was launched on 2 July 2014, Soil Moisture Active Passive (SMAP) was launched on 31 January 2015, and JPSS-1 was launched on 18 November 2017. All three of these launches were placed into orbit from SLC-2 at Vandenberg.

The Delta II family launched 155 times. Its only unsuccessful launches were Koreasat 1 in 1995, and GPS IIR-1 in 1997. The Koreasat 1 launch was a partial failure caused by one booster not separating from the first stage, which resulted in the satellite being placed in a lower than intended orbit. By using reserve fuel, it was able to achieve its proper geosynchronous orbit and operated for 10 years. The GPS IIR-1 was a total loss as the Delta II exploded 13 seconds after launch. The explosion occurred when a damaged solid rocket booster casing ruptured and triggered the vehicle's flight termination system. No one was injured, and the launch pad itself was not seriously impacted, though several cars were destroyed and a few buildings were damaged.

In 2007, Delta II completed its 75th consecutive successful launch, surpassing the 74 consecutive successful launches of the Ariane 4. With the launch of ICESat-2 in 2018, Delta II reached 100 consecutive successful launches.

While all completed Delta II rockets have launched, many flight-qualified spare parts remain. These spare parts were assembled to create a nearly-complete Delta II, for exhibition in its 7420-3 configuration. The rocket is displayed vertically at the Kennedy Space Center Visitors Complex, and bears its popular "shark teeth" livery on its fairing, which was painted on past Delta II rockets for the GPS launches.

Vehicle description 

The first stage of the Delta II was propelled by a Rocketdyne RS-27 main engine burning RP-1 and liquid oxygen. This stage was technically referred to as the "Extra-Extended Long Tank Thor", a derivative of the Thor ballistic missile  as were all Delta rockets until the Delta IV. The RS-27 used on the 6000-series Delta II produced , while the upgraded RS-27A used by the 7000-series produced . In addition, two LR101-NA-11 vernier engines provided guidance for the first stage.

For additional thrust during launch, the Delta II used solid boosters. For the 6000-series, Delta II used Castor 4A boosters, while the 7000-series used Graphite-Epoxy Motors manufactured by ATK. The vehicle could be flown with three, four, or, most commonly, nine boosters. When three or four boosters were used, all ignited on the ground at launch, while models that used nine boosters would ignite six on the ground, then the remaining three in flight after the burnout and jettison of the first six.

These propellants are highly toxic and corrosive, and once loaded the launch had to occur within approximately 37 days or the stage would have to be refurbished or replaced. This stage also contained a combined inertial platform and guidance system that controlled all flight events.

For low Earth orbit, Delta II was not equipped with a third stage. Payloads bound for higher energy orbits such as GTO or to reach Earth escape velocity for trans-Mars injection or other destinations beyond Earth used a solid propellant third stage. This stage was spin-stabilized and depended on the second stage for proper orientation prior to stage separation, but was sometimes equipped with a nutation control system to maintain proper spin axis. It also included a yo-weight system to induce tumbling in the third stage after payload separation to prevent recontact, or a yo-yo de-spin mechanism to slow the rotation before payload release.

Naming system 
The Delta II family used a four-digit system to generate its technical names:
 The first digit was either 6 or 7, denoting the 6000- or 7000-series Delta.
 The second digit indicated the number of boosters. Most Delta II rockets flew with 9 boosters, but some flew with 3 or 4.
 The third digit was always 2, denoting a second stage with an Aerojet AJ10 engine. Only Deltas prior to the 6000-series used a different engine, the TR-201.
 The last digit denoted the third stage. 0 denoted no third stage, 5 indicated a Payload Assist Module (PAM) stage with Star 48B solid motor, and 6 indicated a Star 37FM motor.
 An H following the four digits denoted that the vehicle used the larger Delta III GEM-46 boosters. The Heavy variant could be launched only from Cape Canaveral (as Vandenberg's pad wasn't modified to handle the larger SRBs), and was retired with the closure of that launch site in 2011.
 Numbers and letters following those indicate the type of fairing. -9.5 means that the vehicle had a  diameter fairing, -10 means a  diameter fairing, and -10L indicates a lengthened  diameter fairing. In a few rare circumstances, an 8-foot diameter fairing (from older Delta rockets) was flown, and those vehicles had a -8 designation.

For example, a Delta 7925H-10L used an RS-27A, nine GEM-46 boosters, a PAM third stage, and a lengthened  diameter fairing. A Delta 6320–9.5 is a two-stage vehicle with an RS-27 first stage engine, three Castor 4A boosters, a  diameter fairing, and no third stage.

Launch profile 

 Launch vehicle build-up A Delta II launch vehicle was assembled vertically on the launch pad. Assembly starts by hoisting the first stage into position. The solid rocket boosters are then hoisted into position and mated with the first stage. Launch vehicle build-up then continues with the second stage being hoisted atop the first stage.

 At T-45 minutes, fueling completion is confirmed. At T-20 minutes, the FTS pyros are armed. At T-20 minutes and T-4 minutes, there are built in holds. During these holds, final checkouts are performed. At T-11 seconds SRB igniters are armed. Ignition is at T-0.4 seconds. The ascent profile varies between missions.
 SRB staging If 9 solid rocket boosters were used, only six were ignited at launch. Once the first six were depleted, three air-start motors would ignite and the ground-start motors would separate. The air-start motors had nozzles optimized for high-altitude as they operated mostly in a near-vacuum during the flight profile.
 If 3 or 4 boosters were used, all were ignited on the ground and jettisoned at the same time.

Delta II launches

Notable payloads 
Earth-orbiting

 GLAST
 Gravity Probe B
 24 GPS satellites
 60 Iridium satellites
 ICESat-2
 Kepler space telescope
 OSTM/Jason-2
 Radarsat-1
 Polar (satellite)
 ROSAT
 Spitzer Space Telescope (SIRTF)
 STSS-ATRR
 Swift
 THEMIS
 USA 193 (NROL-21)
 WIND
 WISE
 WMAP

Extra-planetary

 2001 Mars Odyssey
 CONTOUR
 Dawn
 Deep Impact
 Deep Space 1
 Genesis
 GRAIL
 Mars Climate Orbiter
 Mars Exploration Rovers
 Mars Global Surveyor
 Mars Pathfinder
 Mars Phoenix
 Mars Polar Lander
 MESSENGER
 NEAR
 STEREO

The last Delta II launch was the ICESat-2 satellite in September 2018.

In 2008, ULA indicated that it had "around half a dozen" unsold Delta II rockets on hand, but ULA CEO Tory Bruno stated in October 2017 that there are no complete, unbooked Delta II rockets left in the ULA inventory; and though there are leftover Delta II parts, there are not enough to build another launch vehicle. The final Delta II rocket is located at the Kennedy Space Center rocket garden.

Comparable rockets 

 Antares
 Ariane 4 (retired)
 GSLV
 Long March 4B
 PSLV
 Soyuz
 Tsyklon-3 (retired)
 Vega

Space debris 
The only person on record ever hit by space debris was hit by a piece of a Delta II rocket. Lottie Williams was exercising in a park in Tulsa on 22 January 1997 when she was hit in the shoulder by a  piece of blackened metallic material. U.S. Space Command confirmed that a used Delta II rocket from the April 1996 launch of the Midcourse Space Experiment had crashed into the atmosphere 30 minutes earlier. The object tapped her on the shoulder and fell off harmlessly onto the ground. Williams collected the item and NASA tests later showed that the fragment was consistent with the materials of the rocket, and Nicholas Johnson, the agency's chief scientist for orbital debris, believes that she was indeed hit by a piece of the rocket.

See also 
 Comparison of orbital launchers families
 Comparison of orbital launch systems

References

External links 

 Delta II page at Boeing.com
 Delta I, II und III launch data at Skyrocket.de
 History of the Delta launch vehicle
 Delta II Launch Weather Commit Criteria

Boeing spacecraft and space launch systems
Delta (rocket family)
United Launch Alliance space launch vehicles
Vehicles introduced in 1989